Jefferson, Powhatan County is an unincorporated community in Powhatan County, in the U.S. state of Virginia. The ZIP Code used is 23139.

References

Unincorporated communities in Virginia
Unincorporated communities in Powhatan County, Virginia